This article comprises a list of characters that play a role in Saint Seiya (also known as Knights of the Zodiac) and its canonical continuation, Saint Seiya: Next Dimension, two manga series created, written and illustrated by Masami Kurumada.

The plot of Saint Seiya begins in 1986, spanning until 1990, and follows a group of five mystical warriors called Saints as they battle in the name of the goddess Athena against agents of evil who seek to rule the Earth. Their main enemy in the first arc of the story is the traitorous Gold Saint of Gemini, who has murdered the representative of Athena and taken his place as leader of the Saints. In the second arc, the Saints are confronted with the god of the sea, Poseidon, who kidnaps the mortal reincarnation of Athena and threatens to flood the world with incessant rain to cleanse it of the evils of mankind. Their final enemy, who appears in the third arc of the series, is the god of the Underworld, Hades, whom Athena has fought since the age of myth.

Saint Seiya: Next Dimension acts both as a prequel and a sequel to the first series. It details the aftermath of the war against Hades and starts with Athena seeking help from the gods of Olympus and from Chronos to save Pegasus Seiya from Hades' curse by travelling back to the 18th century. The two main antagonists are the troops of the goddess Artemis, in the 20th century storyline, and the incarnation of Hades in the 18th century.

Protagonists

Pegasus Seiya

 is the Bronze Saint of Pegasus in the 20th century and titular character of the series. An orphaned child later revealed to be one of Mitsumasa Kido's sons, he was separated from his sister Seika and sent to Greece to become a Saint, a soldier of the goddess Athena. Initially motivated by the desire to rejoin his sister, he eventually discovers he has protected Athena for millennia, his soul returning every time she reincarnates to assist her in the battles against the evil agents that threaten the Earth. As a warrior of immense might, Seiya achieves victory in impossible battles, occasionally donning the Sagittarius Gold Cloth before particularly challenging opponents. He defeats the gods Poseidon and Hades, although the latter curses him at the end of Saint Seiya to stop his cycle of rebirth. He is left in a comatose state which Athena seeks to revert in the canonic sequel Next Dimension. Seiya is proclaimed as the future Gold Saint of the Sagittarius successor to Sagittarius Aiolos.

Andromeda Shun

 is the Bronze Saint of Andromeda and Phoenix Ikki's younger brother, although he shares the same father as the rest of the main Bronze Saints. He trained at Andromeda Island under the Silver Saint Cepheus Daidalos and returned to Japan after earning his Cloth, hoping to be reunited with Ikki. He helps Athena reclaim Sanctuary and later becomes involved in the battles against Poseidon and his Generals. In the final arc, it is revealed that the necklace he has carried since he was a baby was given to him by Pandora, to mark his body as Hades's future container. Ikki manages to free him after the god takes hold of his body and both follow Athena to Elysion, where Shun briefly dons the Virgo Gold Cloth and helps to finally defeat Hades. In Next Dimension(canonical sequel and prequel), Shun accompanies Athena to the 18th century, to save Seiya from the curse of Hades's sword. There, he joins forces with the former Pegasus Saint, Tenma, to save the helpless goddess from Hades's Specters.
Shun is proclaimed as the future Gold Saint of Virgo successor to Virgo Shaka.
In the anime adaptation, his master's name was changed to Albiore.

Dragon Shiryu

 is the Bronze Saint protected by the constellation of Draco the Dragon, considered the calmest and most collected of the protagonists. As one of Mitsumada Kido's sons, he was sent at an early age to the Five Old Peaks of Rozan to train under the Libra Gold Saint and acquire the Dragon Cloth. This Cloth is known for possessing the strongest fist and shield. After he returns to Japan, Shiryu becomes involved in the battles to recover the Gold Cloth from Ikki and the Black Saints, and eventually discovers that Saori Kido is the goddess Athena whom he swore to protect. In the ensuing battle against the Silver Saint Perseus Algol, Shiryu is forced to blind himself to achieve victory. He recovers his sight upon awakening his seventh sense during the fight against Cancer Deathmask, but later loses it a second time while facing Poseidon's General Chrysaor Krishna. More than once, he dons the Libra Gold Cloth when confronting a particularly powerful opponent. In the Next Dimension official sequel of the manga of Saint Seiya, Shiryu and Shunrei have adopted a baby whom they named Shoryu. Then, he goes back in time with Hyoga, to the time of the previous Holy War against Hades in the eighteenth century, in order to help Saori / Athena save Seiya's life, who is cursed by the sword of the god of the underworld. Shiryu is proclaimed as the future Gold Saint of Libra successor to Dohko, from the Gold Saint of the eighteenth century Libra Dohko(Young)

Cygnus Hyoga

, also known as Swan Hyoga in several international adaptations, is the Bronze Saint of Cygnus. He was born in the fictional village of Kohoutek, in eastern Siberia, which, at the time when Kurumada wrote and drew his manga, was in the Soviet Union. His mastery over his Cosmo grants him the ability to create ice and snow at temperatures as low as absolute zero by stopping subatomic particles. Hyoga is often portrayed wearing a cross and rosary of the Northern Cross, another name for the Cygnus constellation. Calm by nature, he displays a seemingly emotionless exterior, but a more tender side of his character emerges on occasions, such as when he expresses his gratitude to Andromeda Shun for having saved his life and his undying devotion to his mentor Aquarius Camus. He first appears in the series as he receives an order from Sanctuary to eliminate his fellow Bronze Saints, but he quickly abandons this mission when he discovers the truth about Saori Kido's identity and joins her in the battles against her enemies. While in Poseidon's Undersea Temple, he reencounters Kraken Isaac, a fellow apprentice of Camus. To repay an old debt to the Mariner, Hyoga sacrifices one of his eyes. He occasionally dons the Aquarius Gold Cloth. In the anime adaptation, he was given a different master: an original character referred to as the Crystal Saint, who was, in turn, Aquarius Camus's apprentice. In Japan, Hyoga is a popular character, ranking second in the main character polls of the Bronze Saints. In the  Next Dimension official sequel of the manga of Saint Seiya, Hyoga goes back in time with Shiryu, to the time of the previous Holy War against Hades in the eighteenth century, in order to help Saori / Athena save Seiya's life, who is cursed by the sword of the god of the underworld. Hyoga is proclaimed as the future Gold Saint of Aquarius successor to Camus, from the Gold Saint of the eighteenth century Aquarius Mystoria

Phoenix Ikki

 is the Bronze Saint of the Phoenix constellation and Shun's older brother. He trained at the hellish Death Queen Island under Guilty, which turned him into a loner, cold and harsh. Ikki first appears as an antagonist, as the leader of the Black Saints who is set on taking the Sagittarius Gold Cloth for himself and destroying the other Bronze Saints for revenge against the Graude Foundation. He later overcomes his hate and becomes an ally to Athena and the Bronze Saints, often arriving at critical moments to save them from certain death. Born under the sign of Leo, Ikki dons the Leo Gold Cloth once, during the fight against the twin gods Hypnos and Thanatos in Elysion. In Saint Seiya: Next Dimension, the ongoing canonical sequel and prequel to Saint Seiya authored by Kurumada that deals with the aftermath of the war against Hades. After Athena visits Mount Olympus to meet her sister Artemis and ask for her help to cure Seiya from the curse Hades inflicted on him, Andromeda Shun is attacked by Artemis's soldiers, the Satellites, and their commander Lascomoune. Shun manages to defeat the Satellites, but not Lascomoune, who nearly takes his life. Ikki then intervenes to protect his brother and defeats the commander of the Satellites. Afterwards, he follows Athena and Shun into the past, to the war against Hades that took place in the eighteenth century. Ikki is proclaimed as the future Gold Saint of the Leo successor to Aiolia, from the Gold Saint of the eighteenth century Leo Kaiser

Saori Kido

, also known as Princess Sienna in some English versions of the series, is the reincarnation of the Greek goddess of war, wisdom, justice and heroic endeavor, in the 20th century. Based on the Greek goddess of the same name, she is the daughter of Zeus and sister of Artemis and Apollo. She usually carries a golden staff representing Nike, the Goddess of Victory, and a shield which can eliminate all evil and owns a powerful Divine Cloth. She is reborn approximately every 250 years to protect the Earth from evil with the help of her loyal Saints. While still a baby, Gemini Saga attempts to kill her, but Sagittarius Aiolos saves her life and delivers her to Mitsumasa Kido, who raises her in secret in Japan. Thirteen years later, after Mitsumasa's death, Saori gathers the Bronze Saints that the Graude Foundation trained and battles to reclaim Sanctuary from Saga's control. During the Poseidon arc, she offers to be locked inside the main pillar in Poseidon's Undersea Temple while it fills with water that would have otherwise flooded the Earth. After her Saints save her, she reseals Poseidon's soul. In the Hades arc, she infiltrates the Underworld and follows Hades to Elysion, where she also seals away the evil god. In Next Dimension, hoping to save Seiya's life from the curse cast on him by Hades's sword, Saori travels to Olympus to ask for Chronos's help. The God of Time sends her back to the 18th century war against Hades, as per her request, but she appears in the past as a helpless baby at the mercy of her enemies.

In the latest chapters of Next Dimension, author Kurumada introduces , Athena's previous incarnation, who descended to Earth once again during the 18th century.

Pegasus Tenma

Trained to be the Pegasus Saint by Crateris Suikyō,  is Seiya's incarnation in the 18th century and Alone's best friend. After he and Alone escape from Libra Dohko and Aries Shion, Tenma realizes that his friend has become Hades. He vows to protect Alone, but, when he tries to make him remember who he is, Pandora and some Skeleton soldiers intervene and Tenma has to be saved by Dohko and Shion. The trio is then beset by Griffon Vermeer and Suikyō, who reveals himself as the Garuda Specter. The Saints manage to escape after Pandora summons the Specters and drink water from the Crateris Cloth to revitalize themselves. There, Tenma sees his future: Seiya in a wheelchair. Returning to Sanctuary with Dohko and Shion, Tenma later encounters Andromeda Shun and the two begin to climb the Twelve Temples, joining forces to protect the infant time-traveling Athena.

An alternate version of Tenma makes an appearance in the spin-off Saint Seiya: The Lost Canvas, where his name is spelled only in katakana.

Other Saints 

Athena's army is composed of warriors known as Saints, who for millennia have battled to protect the goddess and the ideals she stands for. They inhabit the Sanctuary and possess superhuman powers thanks to their Cosmo, the energy of the Big Bang that dwells inside every being. They are divided into three hierarchical ranks – Bronze, Silver and Gold – and wear armors that are linked to the constellations named Cloths. Although all Saints have sworn allegiance to the goddess, Kurumada first presented most of them in an antagonistic role.

Antagonists

The first characters to appear in an antagonistic role are the Black Saints, servants of Phoenix Ikki on his quest to kill all the Bronze Saints. The second were most of the Silver and Gold Saints, deceived by the dark personality of the Gemini Gold Saint Saga. The short story dedicated to Hyōga that followed the Sanctuary arc of the manga introduced the Blue Warriors from the icy lands of Bluegrad. Afterwards, most antagonists were various deities from Greek mythology: Poseidon and Hades, in the original Saint Seiya, and the Olympians of the Heavenly Realm, in Saint Seiya: Next Dimension. The anime adaptation of the manga introduced several other antagonists, such as the Ghost Saints and Odin's God Warriors.

Support characters

 Hades' chosen vessel in the 18th century, with the purest soul on earth. Prior to the Holy war, he was best friends with Pegasus Tenma since childhood. He first met Tenma during a snowstorm one night, in an abandoned shack where they both sought refuge. Tenma deceived Alone at first so that he could steal his belongings, but was stopped by Suikyō. As Suikyō was going to kill Tenma for theft, Alone lied and said he had given his bag to Tenma. Suikyō was eventually convinced and told Tenma he was now in debt to Alone and should therefore guard Alone for the rest of his life. At the start of the war, he could feel that darkness was headed his way, and that it came after him. He and Tenma escaped from Libra Dohko and Aries Shion, and ended up outside a small mausoleum. As Tenma went back to retrieve his Cloth, a voice called for Alone inside the mausoleum. As he entered, he found Hades' Sword stuck in the ground. It was then that Pandora showed herself and convinced Alone of grabbing the hilt of the sword. Alone started plunging into darkness and ignored Tenma as he strode towards Hades' Castle.

Voiced by: Hiroko Emori, Karen Hatch (English)
Apprentice under Aries Mu. Also known as Appendix Kiki. Like his master and grandmaster, Kiki also bears the ornaments on his forehead and is the youngest of the people of the continent of Mu. He never fights, but can use powerful telekinesis against normal humans, as well as teleport himself, and can tell when the cloths are damaged. In the Poseidon arc, he was given the duty of bringing the Libra Cloth to all the Bronze Saints, fulfilling it valiantly even at the risk of his life.

Voiced by: Banjo Ginga, Matt Culpepper (English)
Formerly a Saint apprentice under Ophiuchus Shaina. During the final fight for the Pegasus Cloth and the status of Saint, Seiya cut off one of his ears, and he hated Seiya for it ever since. Cassios had great respect and affection toward Shaina; however, he realizes that Shaina had affection toward Seiya. Motivated by this, he takes Seiya's place and dies during the fight with Leo Aiolia in order to wake the Leo Gold Saint from the control of Saga's Dellusional Demon's Emperor Fist. In the anime adaptation, he was also the younger brother of Docrates, an anime-only character.

Voiced by: Chisato Nakajima
She was sold as a work slave to an abusive local farmer for only three bags of grain. When Ikki first encountered her, he mistook her for Shun, because she and Shun shared the same facial features with the only differences being hair color and gender. She was killed by Guilty, Ikki's master, in order to provoke Ikki into drawing power from hatred. In the anime adaptation her background is the same, with the addition of being Guilty's daughter.

Voiced by: Yuko Nagashima
Lyra Orphée's lover, she enjoyed great happiness at the Saint's side on Earth, until the day of her untimely death because of a snake bite. Crushed by her demise, Orphée descended to the Underworld to bargain for her soul with Hades. Touched by the Saint's pleas and melody, she was allowed to return to Earth by the deity, only to be thwarted by Sphinx Pharaoh. She thus was condemned to remain bound to the Underworld half-turned into stone, and later helped Seiya and Shun to unearth Orphée's seemingly forgotten loyalty to Athena.

Voiced by: Hidekatsu Shibata
Master of Phoenix Ikki during his stance on Death Queen Island. Harsh and heartless, and concealing his features behind a fearsome mask, Guilty employed brutal methods in Ikki's training, to force him to become a being of pure hate, to be able to wield the power of the Phoenix Cloth. Guilty was responsible for Esmeralda's death, and died at the hands of Ikki, as his final trial to become a Saint, not before revealing to Ikki the secret of his birth. Also known as the mysterious Saint, Masami Kurumada never revealed Guilty's destined constellation.

The enormous, three-headed demonic watchdog guarding the entrance to the Underworld. Savage, grotesque in appearance and emitting a foul stench, it relentlessly devoured souls that belonged to greedy people in life. Sphinx Pharaoh was in charge of taking care of the creature, and it was defeated temporarily by Pegasus Seiya and Andromeda Shun.

Voiced by: Naoko Watanabe, Sasha Paysinger (English)
 Seiya's fellow orphan and childhood friend, she works at the orphanage where she and Seiya, along with his sister Seika lived before Seiya was taken away. Miho is in love with Seiya to some degree, and in a sense represents the point of view of the normal people who are mere witnesses to the struggles among the gods.

Voiced by: Kōhei Miyauchi, Marty Fleck (English)
 Foster-grandfather of Saori who adopted her and took her to Japan after finding a dying Sagittarius Aiolos in Sanctuary. In the manga, it was revealed that he was actually the birth father of all the orphans he sent around the world to be trained as Saints. In the anime, he merely took the children from various orphanages, and sent them for their training. Just before he died, he told Saori all the truth regarding the encounter with Aiolos in Sanctuary and her divine origins and purpose of her birth in this era. He is known as Lord Nobu in some English versions.

Voiced by: Akiko Tsuboi
One of Mitsumasa Kido's women and late mother of Cygnus Hyōga. After dying in a shipwreck, her remains were preserved intact by the gelid waters of the Siberian seas. Kurumada later introduced a character of the same name in the short story arc dedicated to Hyōga in the thirteenth volume of the manga, sister to Alexei, leader of the Blue Warriors.

Tenma's loyal horse and steed. He saved Shion's, Dohko and Tenma's lives, by protecting them from the Skeleton soldiers.

Voiced by: Yuriko Yamamoto, Satsuki Yukino OVA
 Seiya's older sister, whom he lost contact with when he was sent to Greece to be trained as a Saint. After Seiya was taken away, she wandered the world looking for him. It was long implied that Marin, Seiya's mentor, could be Seika, and some characters, including Seiya, thought it was possibly true. Marin and Seika even shared the same physical characteristics: same age, same birthdate, same height, same birthplace. Also, Marin has a brother she lost and was looking for. Seika resurfaced as a separate character in the Hades chapter, completely amnesiac, after having followed Seiya all the way to Greece alone. It was Seika's voice that, more than any other, urged Seiya on in his fight against Thanatos. It is then revealed in the final arc of Kurumada's manga that Seika and Marin are not the same person.

A new character introduced by Kurumada in Next Dimension, an  orphaned baby, found in the Five Old Peaks fairylands of Lushan, by Shunrei. He is very fond of Shiryū.

Voiced by: Yumiko Shibata, Eriko Sato OVA, Ai Bandō Elysion OVA, Kimberly Prause (English)
Shunrei was an abandoned orphan found by Dohko in Rozan (China). She cares deeply for Shiryū, and her prayers for Shiryū's safety in battle often help him through his darkest hours, particularly against Cancer Deathmask, as well as against the Specter trio of Sylphid, Gordon and Queen.

Garuda Suikyō's younger brother. The Specter is forced to reminisce about him after suffering the effects of Phoenix Ikki's Demonic Illusion Attack. Suishō was afflicted by a terminal disease, thus Hades offered Suikyō to save his brother's life in exchange of loyalty to him. Suishō died shortly after the deity's offering. Suishō's background remains to be revealed in further detail by Kurumada.

The Pope ruling Sanctuary in the 18th century, a survivor of the Holy War against Hades in the 15th century. He grants Shion and Dohko the rank of Gold Saints and the right to don the Aries and Libra Gold Cloths. He also foresees Hades' return to Earth and prepares Sanctuary to face such event. A false Pope, who swore allegiance to Hades also plays a role in the storyline, whether he and the legitimate Pope are the same person, still remains to be revealed by Kurumada.

Voiced by: Yukitoshi Hori, Ron Howald (English)
Saori's butler, bodyguard and right-hand man. Trusted man of Mitsumasa Kido and a black belt, third dan in Kendō. He was in charge of overseeing the orphans who were to be sent out all over the world to train and become Bronze Saints, and due to his extreme severity and at times downright abusive behavior, most of them were resentful towards him. He always tried to be strong and protect Saori, but even the Sanctuary soldiers can defeat him. (Not without struggle, however, as he offered considerable resistance for an outnumbered man). He starts as a rather daunting and abusive retainer for the future Saints, but he is in truth a man who is honor-bound to protect Saori, and ultimately is the series' comic relief.

Voiced by: Tomiko Suzuki
A young boy from Kohoutek village, in Eastern Siberia, neighbor and good friend of Cygnus Hyōga. He watches over Natasha's eternal sleep when Hyōga is absent due to his responsibilities as a Saint. He helps Hyōga in various domestic tasks and also assisted the Saint in his escape from the Blue Warriors' imprisonment.

Other deities

Briefly mentioned in the first chapter of Kurumada's manga, the fierce and bloodthirsty god of war, who battled Athena and her Saints millennia ago, in the ages of myth.

 and 
Briefly mentioned by Libra Dohko in vol.27 of Kurumada's manga, the mighty Titans, whose union gave birth to Hades, god of the Underworld, in the ages of myth.

Mentioned by Thanatos in vol. 27 of Kurumada's manga, attributing the nymphs' agitation caused by Pegasus Seiya, to his usual mischief.

Mentioned briefly in the first chapter of the manga; the ancient race of giants, who battled Athena and her army in the ages of myth in a conflict that became known as the Gigantomachia in Greek myths.

 The god who rules time. Said to be shapeless and hidden within the universe. Athena meets with him in the gate to time-space. Chronos helps Athena to return to the era of the previous Holy War in order to remove Hades' curse from Seiya, turning her into a baby.

 
The greek goddess of victory, who is always at Athena's side, manifested in the form of her golden staff, leading the Saints to triumph. Her true form is visible in the giant Athena Parthenos statue in Sanctuary.

Father of Athena and the supreme god of the Olympus. His participation is to date, reduced to only mentions by other characters and in background narrative.

He is mentioned in passing when Athena visits Artemis, and is said to merely watch over the time of the day. Older brother of Athena and Artemis.

Voiced by: Tomomichi Nishimura
An enlightened being with whom Shaka conversed during his childhood, and taught him the true value of life. Although Kurumada hints at the true identity of this being as Siddharta Gautama, the Supreme Buddha, he doesn't confirm neither he is Buddha Gautama nor if he was who instructed Shaka in the ways of the Saints.

Voiced by: Yui Kano
The minor divine spirits in Elysion, who delight Thanatos with their beautiful voice and music.

Characters outside the manga and the anime

Considered canonical within the universe of Saint Seiya, as they were created by Masami Kurumada, these characters were not introduced in his manga, but instead in the first Saint Seiya film. They were also featured in the musical Saint Seiya: Super Musical of 2011, which is based on the same film. They are five former Saints, collectively known as the Ghost Saints: Southern Cross Khristós (voiced by Ryūsei Nakao in the film and played by Yūki Fujiwara in the musical); Sagitta Maya, predecessor of Sagitta Ptolemy (voiced by Michitaka Kobayashi and played by Yūki Matsuoka); Scutum Jan (voiced by Keiichi Nanba and played by Takeshi Hayashino); Lyra Orpheus, predecessor of Lyra Orphée (voiced by Yūji Mitsuya and played by Yasuka Saitoh); and Orion Jäger (voiced by Yū Mizushima and played by Yutaka Matsuzaki).

Kurumada contributed to designing the looks of the God Warriors of Odin in 1988's Saint Seiya: The Heated Battle of the Gods, but had virtually no involvement in the creation of Abel and his three Corona Saints in 1988's Saint Seiya: Legend of Crimson Youth or of Lucifer and the Fallen Angels in Saint Seiya: Warriors of the Final Holy Battle. On the other hand, the 2004 film Saint Seiya Heaven Chapter: Overture was based on an original story by Kurumada. Since the discontinuation of the project, however, the characters and events of that film have since been replaced in the canonical continuity of the series by those found in Next Dimension.

Anime-only characters

The anime adaptation of Saint Seiya features several original characters. Author Masami Kurumada was not involved in their creation process. Although these characters had a participation in the storyline to some extent, some were later retconned from the continuity of the anime itself to keep it closer to the manga. They range from support to antagonistic characters.

References

Saint Seiya